Municipal election for Itahari took place on 13 May 2022, with all 102 positions up for election across 20 wards. The electorate elected a mayor, a deputy mayor, 20 ward chairs and 80 ward members. An indirect election will also be held to elect five female members and an additional three female members from the Dalit and minority community to the municipal executive.

Hem Karna Paudel from Nepali Congress was elected as the mayor of the metropolitan city defeating CPN (UML) candidate.

Background 

Itharai was established as a municipality in 1997. The sub-metropolitan city was created in 2014 by merging nearby village development committees into Itahari municipality. Electors in each ward elect a ward chair and four ward members, out of which two must be female and one of the two must belong to the Dalit community.

In the previous election, Dwarik Lal Chaudhary of the CPN (Unified Marxist–Leninist) was elected as the first mayor of the sub-metropolitan city.

Candidates

Opinion poll

Exit polls

Results

Mayoral election

Ward results 

|-
! colspan="2" style="text-align:centre;" | Party
! Chairman
! Members
|-
| style="background-color:;" |
| style="text-align:left;" |Communist Party of Nepal (UML)
| style="text-align:center;" | 14
| style="text-align:center;" | 60
|-
| style="background-color:;" |
| style="text-align:left;" |Nepali Congress
| style="text-align:center;" | 5
| style="text-align:center;" | 16
|-
| style="background-color:;" |
| style="text-align:left;" |Independent
| style="text-align:center;" | 1
| style="text-align:center;" | 4
|-
! colspan="2" style="text-align:right;" | Total
! 20
! 80
|}

Summary of results by ward

Council formation

See also 

 2022 Nepalese local elections
 2022 Lalitpur municipal election
 2022 Kathmandu municipal election
 2022 Janakpur municipal election
 2022 Pokhara municipal election

References

Itahari